Bounty (formally known as Botany) is an unincorporated community in Fertile Valley No. 285 Saskatchewan, Canada. The population was 5 at the 2001 Census. It previously held the status of village until November 25, 1997. At one time Bounty was said to have nobody living in the community.

History 
Prior to November 25, 1997, Bounty was incorporated as a village, and was restructured as an unincorporated community under the jurisdiction of the Rural municipality of Fertile Valley on that date.

Demographics 
In 1996, the former Village of Bounty had a population of 18 living in six dwellings, a -35.7% decrease from 1991.

See also 
 Ghost towns in Saskatchewan
 List of communities in Saskatchewan

References 

1908 establishments in Saskatchewan
Fertile Valley No. 285, Saskatchewan
Former villages in Saskatchewan
Populated places established in 1908
Unincorporated communities in Saskatchewan
Populated places disestablished in 1997